The City and Liberty of Westminster was a unit of local government in the county of Middlesex, England. It was located immediately to the west of the City of London. Originally under the control of Westminster Abbey, the local authority for the area was the Westminster Court of Burgesses from 1585 to 1900. The area now forms the southern part of the City of Westminster in Greater London.

Governance
Following the dissolution of Westminster Abbey, a court of burgesses (the Westminster Court of Burgesses) was formed in 1585 to govern the Westminster area, previously under the Abbey's control. The City and Liberties of Westminster were further defined by Letters Patent in 1604, and the court of burgesses and liberty continued in existence until 1900, and the creation of the Metropolitan Borough of Westminster.

The court of burgesses (or court leet) was headed by the High Steward of Westminster Abbey, who was usually a prominent national politician. He appointed a high bailiff, who served for life, and performed most of the functions usually exercised by a high sheriff of a county. The city and liberty were divided into twelve wards, each with a burgess and assistant burgess, this arrangement being adopted from the system then used in the City of London. Eight wards were located in the parish of St Margaret, three in St Martin in the Fields, and one for St Clement Danes and the Strand area.

The burgesses chose two head burgesses, one for the city and one for the liberty, who ranked next after the high bailiff. A high constable was appointed by the court leet, under whom was a force of constables. These were absorbed by the Metropolitan Police in 1829.

Following the dissolution of the court of burgesses in 1900, a link has been retained to the old corporation, as the Lord Mayor of Westminster is ex officio Deputy High Steward of Westminster Abbey.

Westminster returned two members to parliament. Although outside the Liberty of Westminster, eligible inhabitants of the Liberty of the Savoy, which included part of the parishes of St Clement Danes and St Mary le Strand voted with Westminster.

The City and Liberty of Westminster was a franchise coroner's district until 1930, when it became part of the Central district of the County of London.

Constituent parishes and other areas
The City of Westminster consisted of:

The main part of the parish of St Margaret; after 1727 the combined parishes of St Margaret and St John.
The extra-parochial Close of the Collegiate Church of St Peter around Westminster Abbey

The Liberty of the City of Westminster consisted of:
The detached part of the parish of St Margaret
The parish of St Martin in the Fields; later partly divided into St Anne (1687), St George Hanover Square (1724), St Paul Covent Garden (1645) and St James (1685)
Part of the parish of St Clement Danes
Part of the parish of St Mary-le-Strand
The extra-parochial St James's Palace
Privy Gardens (also known as Whitehall Gardens)
Verge of the Palaces of St James and Whitehall (also known as Whitehall)

Geography
The Penny Cyclopaedia in 1843 describes the boundaries as:

Notes

References

History of the City of Westminster
Liberties of London
Hundreds and divisions of Middlesex